The INEC Abia State Office is a branch of the Independent National Electoral Commission that coordinates, supervises and organizes political elections in Abia State. On August 2, 2015, some parts of the office which is headquartered at Obingwa local government was burnt down by political thugs during the 2015 Nigerian general election. The INEC Abia State Office is headed by a Resident Electoral Commissioner (REC), currently Sylvester Ezeani.

See also
Abia State Government
Independent National Electoral Commission

References

Buildings and structures in Abia State
Organizations based in Abia State